David Keane (b Ballyagran 27 February 1871; d Limerick 13 March 1945) was an Irish Roman Catholic Bishop in the 20th Century.

Keane  was educated at St Colman's College, Fermoy and St Patrick's College, Maynooth. He was ordained priest on 23 June 1895. After a curacy in Jersey he joined the staff of St Munchin's College. He was parish priest of Glin, County Limerick from 1919 until his appointment as Bishop of Limerick. He was consecrated on 2 March 1924 and e died in post. The Limerick Leader wrote"A great bishop passes -  Death of Most Rev. Dr. Keane - Eminent and saintly spiritual ruler"
Keane is buried in the north transept at St John's Cathedral.

References

1871 births
1945 deaths
20th-century Roman Catholic bishops in Ireland
Roman Catholic bishops of Ardagh and Clonmacnoise
Alumni of St Patrick's College, Maynooth
People educated at St Colman's College, Fermoy
Bishops of Limerick